Women's Bridge or Woman's Bridge may refer to:

 Waterloo Bridge, a road bridge in London, England
 Puente de la Mujer, a footbridge in Buenos Aires, Argentina

See also
 Lady's Bridge (disambiguation)